Arnfinn Kolbjørn Heje (26 October 1877 – 29 January 1958) was a Norwegian sailor who competed in the 1912 Summer Olympics. He was a crew member of the Norwegian boat Magda IX, which won the gold medal in the 12 metre class.

References

External links
profile

1877 births
1958 deaths
Norwegian male sailors (sport)
Sailors at the 1912 Summer Olympics – 12 Metre
Olympic sailors of Norway
Olympic gold medalists for Norway
Olympic medalists in sailing
Medalists at the 1912 Summer Olympics